The Equatoguinean Primera División Femenina is the top flight of women's association football in Equatorial Guinea. The competition is run by the Equatoguinean Football Federation.

History
In 2001, a mini-championship is played by five teams, Estrellas de Ewaiso Ipola wins this tournament called Liguilla Nacional. A real championship was created in 2008 with 12 participating clubs.

Champions
The list of champions and runners-up:

Most successful clubs

See also
 Copa de la Primera Dama de la Nación
 Equatoguinean Super Copa femenina

References

External links 
 FEGUIFUT official website

Women's association football leagues in Africa
Football competitions in Equatorial Guinea
Women
Sports leagues established in 2008
Women's sport in Equatorial Guinea